Belthara Road is a constituency of the Uttar Pradesh Legislative Assembly covering the city of Belthara Road in the Ballia district of Uttar Pradesh, India.

Belthara Road is one of five assembly constituencies in the Lok Sabha constituency of Salempur. Since 2008, this assembly constituency is numbered 357 amongst 403 constituencies.

Election results

2022

2017
Bharatiya Janta Party candidate Dhananjay Kannoujia won in last Assembly election of 2017 Uttar Pradesh Legislative Elections defeating Samajwadi Party candidate Gorakh Paswan by a margin of 18,319 votes.

Members of Legislative Assembly

References

External links
 

Assembly constituencies of Uttar Pradesh